Jody Steel is an American artist, known for her photorealistic body-paintings.

Steel depicts her illustration process in a series of timelapse videos. She became known after a classroom sketch of Breaking Bad's Walter White on her thigh gained international attention online.  

Some of her other work gained over 70 million views online. Steel was a film production student at Emerson College until 2013.

References

External links
Facebook Page

Living people
21st-century American women artists
Emerson College alumni
Year of birth missing (living people)